Andrew Harman is a science fiction and fantasy fiction author from the United Kingdom. His novels bear titles that pun on other famous works. Each work reflects its playful title, having a plot matching the work to which it alludes, with a humorous twist.

Many of his novels are set in the fictional UK town of Camford, which is a hybridisation of the two university towns of Oxford and Cambridge.

His books are published under the Orbit imprint in the UK.

Andrew Harman studied biochemistry at the University of York, being a member of Wentworth College.

Andrew Harman has since moved on to create YAY Games, a UK independent publisher of board and card games. This award-winning company released Frankenstein's Bodies in 2014 – inspired by the works of Iain Lowson in his RPG Dark Harvest: The Legacy of Frankenstein. This was followed in 2015 by the family friendly hit Sandcastles and 2016 sees the launch of Ominoes the brand new 6,000 year old game.

Works

Firkin series 
The Sorcerer's Appendix (1993)
The Frogs of War (1994)
The Tome Tunnel (1994)
Fahrenheit 666 (1995)
One Hundred And One Damnations (1995)

Standalone novels 
The Scrying Game (1996)
The Deity Dozen (1996)
A Midsummer Night's Gene (1997)
It Came from On High (1998) aka Beyond Belief (this was a working title)
The Suburban Salamander Incident (1999)
Talonspotting (2000)

Note: Beyond Belief (1998), which shows up in various Internet booklists, does not exist, as it was the working title that became It Came From On High – the satirical novel about what occurs when the Pope discovers that aliens exist.

External links 

British science fiction writers
Alumni of the University of York
Living people
Year of birth missing (living people)